Tobía is a village in Spain. It may also refer to:

 Tobia (name), list of people with the name
 Baños de Río Tobía, manucipality in Spain
 I ragazzi di padre Tobia, Italian television series
 Il ritorno di Tobia, oratorio by Joseph Haydn 
 Schinia tobia, moth of the family Noctuidae